Group C of the 1986 FIFA  World Cup was one of the groups of nations competing at the 1986 FIFA World Cup. The group's first round of matches began on 1 June and its last matches were played on 9 June. Matches were played at the Estadio Nou Camp in León and the Estadio Sergio León Chavez in Irapuato. The Soviet Union topped the group on goal difference over France. Both teams advanced to the second round. Hungary and Canada were the other two teams, the latter making their debut at the World Cup.

Standings

Matches

Canada vs France

Soviet Union vs Hungary

France vs Soviet Union

Hungary vs Canada

Hungary vs France

Soviet Union vs Canada

Group C
France at the 1986 FIFA World Cup
Soviet Union at the 1986 FIFA World Cup
Canada at the 1986 FIFA World Cup
C